Sabatelli is an Italian surname. Notable people with the surname include:

Felice Sabatelli (1710–1786), Italian astronomer
Francesco Sabatelli (1803–1830), Italian painter
Giuseppe Sabatelli (1813–1843), Italian painter
Luigi Sabatelli (1772–1850), Italian painter, father of Francesco and Giuseppe

Italian-language surnames